Per Gunnar Fredrik de Frumerie (20 July 1908, in Nacka, Stockholm County – 9 September 1987, in Täby, Stockholm County) was a Swedish composer and pianist. He was the son of architect Gustaf de Frumerie and Maria Helleday.

After studying piano in Stockholm and Vienna, he studied under Alfred Cortot in Paris. He then studied at the Royal College of Music, Stockholm from 1923–1928. Frumerie later taught the piano at the same college, from 1945 to 1974.

His compositions covered a wide area, from grand opera to piano miniatures, but he is best remembered for his piano works. His works possess a Brahmsian complexity mixed with an impressionistic elegance. One can relate his music to such composers as Lars-Erik Larsson or Wilhelm Peterson-Berger.

Although not noted for his theatre work, he did write an opera, Singoalla (1940). He wrote many songs, often to words by Pär Lagerkvist. The cello concerto (1984) has an interesting history. It was adapted from his second cello sonata. He then adapted it into a trombone concerto, and was his last completed work. It was specifically written for the Swedish trombone virtuoso Christian Lindberg.

His pupils included Laci Boldemann.

The Swedish mezzo-soprano Anne Sofie von Otter is related to Frumerie, as she is descended from the Frumerie family. They were both members of the Royal Swedish Academy of Music. The soprano Nina Stemme is also a Frumerie relative.

Selected compositions 

 Duo for oboe and viola (1928)
 Piano Trio No.1, Op.7
 Suite, Op.13b
 Violin Concerto, Op.19 (1936, rev. 1975-6)
 Piano Quartet No.1 in C minor, Op.23
 Symphonic Variations, Op.25 (1940–41)
 Piano Trio No.2, Op.45
 Singoalla (1940)
 Cello Sonata No.2 (1949)
 Circulus Quintus, twenty-four pieces in all keys for piano, Op. 62 (1965)
 Divertimento for clarinet (or viola) and cello, Op.63 (1966)
 Piano Sonata No.1, Op. 64
 Piano Sonata No.2, Op. 65
 Tio variationer över en svensk folkvisa (Ten Variations on a Swedish Folk Song) for viola and guitar, Op.69b (1977)
 Musica per nove, Nonet, Op.75
 Dante, Op.76 (1977, for voice and orchestra) 
 Cello Concerto, Op.81 (1984)
 Trombone Concerto, Op.81 (1987; posthumous)
 Sonata for trombone and piano, Op.81b (posthumous)
 Organ Overture, Aria and Fugue
 St. John's Eve: Ballet in two acts and four pictures (Released 1983)

1908 births
1987 deaths
20th-century classical composers
Litteris et Artibus recipients
Members of the Royal Swedish Academy of Music
Royal College of Music, Stockholm alumni
Swedish classical composers
Swedish male classical composers
Swedish nobility
20th-century Swedish male musicians
20th-century Swedish musicians

Swedish people of Walloon descent
Gunnar De